Kuhan Shanmuganathan (born 23 July 1976) is a retired field hockey player from Port Dickson, Negeri Sembilan, Malaysia. Kuhan is known as one of the penalty corner specialist.

Career

Club
Kuhan made his debut in the Malaysia Hockey League for Yayasan Negeri Sembilan in 1992. He won two league titles in 1995 and 1996. After his stint in Negeri Sembilan, Kuhan joined Petaling Jaya City Council in 1997 and won a league title. In the same year he went on three-month stints with clubs in Germany. He played for Limburg HC. Two years later, he featured for Bank Simpanan Nasional (BSN) and won another league title.

In 2000, he played for Sapura and stayed there for 12 years. It proved to be a fruitful union as Sapura went on to win four titles. They were double champions in 2005 and clinched the league title in 2004 and overall Cup in 2006. In 2005, Kuhan joined Bangalore Hi-Fliers that play in India Hockey Premier League.

Kuhan also emerged the Malaysia Hockey League’s top scorer three times in 1997, 1999 and 2003. He currently served as team manager of Sapura.

International
Kuhan won 341 caps for Malaysia. He has played in competitive competitions such as the World Cup, Olympics, Champions Challenge, Commonwealth Games, Asian Games and Asia Cup.

He also the Malaysia hockey team skipper for six years since taking over from Mirnawan Nawawi in 2000. Kuhan announce his retirement after Malaysian Hockey Federation's decision to drop him from the national training squad in early 2007. He return from his retirement in 2007 Southeast Asian Games. It is his last appearances for the Malaysia hockey team.

References

External links
 

1976 births
Living people
People from Negeri Sembilan
Malaysian people of Tamil descent
Malaysian sportspeople of Indian descent
Malaysian male field hockey players
Male field hockey defenders
Olympic field hockey players of Malaysia
Field hockey players at the 1996 Summer Olympics
Field hockey players at the 2000 Summer Olympics
1998 Men's Hockey World Cup players
2002 Men's Hockey World Cup players
Commonwealth Games silver medallists for Malaysia
Commonwealth Games bronze medallists for Malaysia
Asian Games medalists in field hockey
Field hockey players at the 2002 Asian Games
Field hockey players at the 2006 Asian Games
Asian Games bronze medalists for Malaysia
Commonwealth Games medallists in field hockey
Medalists at the 2002 Asian Games
Southeast Asian Games gold medalists for Malaysia
Southeast Asian Games medalists in field hockey
Field hockey players at the 1998 Commonwealth Games
Field hockey players at the 2006 Commonwealth Games
Competitors at the 1999 Southeast Asian Games
Competitors at the 2001 Southeast Asian Games
Competitors at the 2007 Southeast Asian Games
Medallists at the 1998 Commonwealth Games
Medallists at the 2006 Commonwealth Games